Oryctolaelaps is a genus of mites in the family Laelapidae.

Species
 Oryctolaelaps bibikovae Lange, in Bregetova et al., 1955

References

Laelapidae